The Mozart Piano Quartet is a classical music piano quartet founded in 2000 in Germany.  The members are pianist Paul Rivinius, violinist Mark Gothoni, violist Hartmut Rohde, and cellist Peter Hoerr, who are all internationally prize-winning soloists.

History

The Mozart Piano Quartet plays a wide range of classical music, and has recorded works by composers such as Beethoven (The Piano Quartet Op. 16 and the Eroica Symphony arranged by Ferdinand Ries), the quartets of Richard Strauss and Antonín Dvořák, as well as the multi award-winning premiere recordings of the great piano quartets by Mélanie Bonis, and Camille Saint-Saëns, which won 'Best Chamber America', 'Editors's Choice' in Gramophone Magazine. There have, as well, been many live radio broadcasts, recordings and productions in places like Germany, the United States, Spain, Italy, Brazil, and Australia.

The Mozart Piano Quartet regularly performs in major festivals and venues in the United States, Europe, and the Far East. These have included Lincoln Center for the Performing Arts, Wigmore Hall, Melbourne Festival, Mahler Festival, and the Concertgebouw in Amsterdam. Their regular tours to North and South America include well-known concert halls in New York, Washington, Los Angeles, Boston, Chicago, and Philadelphia as well as in the halls in Brazil, Colombia, Peru, Mexico, and Canada.

Members

Piano

Tamara Cislowska (2000-2004)
Paul Rivinius (2004–present)

Violin

Natalie Chee (2000-2004)
Mark Gothoni (2004–present)

Viola

Hartmut Rohde

Violoncello

Peter Hoerr

Discography  (2000-2018)
The Mozart Piano Quartet records exclusively for the German label Dabringhaus & Grimm (MDG)
Piano Quartet and Horn Quintet by H.G.Witte by January 2018 (2018), MDG
Schumann / Brahms: Piano Quartets (2011)
Mozart - Piano Quartets KV478 & KV493 (2009)
Saint-Saëns - Piano Quartets (2009)
Bonis - Piano Quartets (2008)
Beethoven - Chamber music (2007)
Strauss - Piano Quartet Op. 13 (2005)
Dvorák - Piano Quartets Op.23 & Op.87 (2003)
Jenner - Complete Chamber Works (2002)
Mozart - Piano Quartets KV 478 & KV 493 (2002)
Brahms - Piano Quartets Op. 26 & Op. 60

References

External links
Mozart Piano Quartet Mozart Piano Quartet official site
Chamber Music Society of Bethlehem and the Mozart Piano Quartet
Shupp Artists Management: Mozart Piano Quartet
Deutschlandfunk Kultur" Das Mozart Piano Quartet

Piano quartets
German classical music groups
Musical groups established in 2000
2000 establishments in Germany